Wache may refer to
Wache Dzong, a fortress in Bhutan
Die Wache, a German weekly police TV procedural that was broadcast in 1994–2006
Dimo Wache (born 1973), German football player
Neue Wache (New Guardhouse), a building in Berlin, Germany